Richard Carlson (May 16, 1961 – December 13, 2006) was an American author, psychotherapist, and motivational speaker. His book, Don’t Sweat the Small Stuff... and it’s all Small Stuff (1997), was USA Today's bestselling book for two consecutive years. and spent over 101 weeks on the New York Times Best Seller list. It was published in 135 countries and translated into Latvian, Polish, Icelandic, Serbian and 26 other languages. Carlson went on to write 20 books.

Early life
Carlson was born and raised in Piedmont, California in East San Francisco Bay Area.   He played tennis and was the top ranked junior in Northern California in 1979.
He received his bachelor's degree from Pepperdine University in Malibu, California, where he met and married Kristine Anderson (Kris Carlson) in 1981.

Career
Carlson started his career as a psychotherapist and ran a stress management centre. He published his first book in 1985, but became famous with his 10th book, Don’t Sweat the Small Stuff…and it’s all Small Stuff.  While Richard Carlson did not coin the term "Don't Sweat the Small Stuff," he was awarded a trademark for bringing it into American pop culture.  The book was number one on the New York Times list for over 100 weeks.  The Don't Sweat series is based on his earlier work presented in "You Can Be Happy, No Matter What: Five Principles to Keep Life in Perspective." People magazine named Richard Carlson as one of that publication's "Most Intriguing People in the World."  He was popular on the talk-show circuit. Meanwhile, he also appeared in a Don't Sweat the Small Stuff... and It's All Small Stuff TV special, and soon took up writing full-time.

His following books include Slowing Down to the Speed of Life (co-authored with Joe Bailey, 1997), one co-authored by his wife, Don't Sweat The Small Stuff in Love (2000), and  What About the Big Stuff (2002). Don't Worry, Make Money (1997) received a starred review from Publishers Weekly.

Death
Carlson died on December 13, 2006, from a pulmonary embolism during a flight from San Francisco to New York, while on a promotion tour for his book Don’t Get Scrooged: How to Thrive in a World Full of Obnoxious, Incompetent, Arrogant and Downright Mean-Spirited People (2006). He was survived by his wife, Kristine Carlson, and their two daughters, Jasmine and Kenna; two sisters, Kathleen Carlson Mowris of Olympic Valley, California and Anna Carlson of La Selva Beach, California; and his parents, Barbara and Don Carlson of Orinda, California. His parents, founders of the charitable organization the ARK Foundation which was dedicated to promoting world peace, passed away after Dr. Carlson's death. His father Donald Carlson died on February 20, 2017, at the age of 84 and had been preceded in death by his wife of 57 years.

Works
 You Can Feel Good Again: Common-Sense Therapy for Releasing Depression and Changing Your Life, Published by Penguin Group (USA) Incorporated, 1994. .
 Handbook for the Soul (with Benjamin Shield), Boston: Little, Brown, 1995.
 Shortcut Through Therapy: ten principles of growth-oriented, contented living, Published by Plume, 1995. .
 Don't Sweat the Small Stuff—and It's All Small Stuff: Simple Ways to Keep the Little Things from Taking Over Your Life. Published by Hyperion, 1997. .
 You Can Be Happy No Matter What: Five Principles Your Therapist Never Told You, Contributor Dr. Wayne Dyer. Published by New World Library, 1997. .
 Don't Worry, Make Money, Published by Hyperion, 1997. .
 Slowing Down to the Speed of Life: How to Create a More Peaceful, Simpler Life from the Inside Out, with Joseph Bailey. Published by HarperCollins, 1998. .
 Don't Sweat the Small Stuff with Your Family: Simple Ways to Keep Daily Responsibilities and Household Chaos from Taking Over Your Life, Published by Hyperion, 1998. .
 A Don't Sweat the Small Stuff Treasury: A Special Selection for Teachers, Published by Hyperion, 1999. .
 Don't Sweat the Small Stuff at Work: Simple Ways to Minimize Stress and Conflict While Bringing Out the Best in Yourself and Others, Published by Hyperion, 1999. .a
 Don't Sweat the Small Stuff Teens: Simple Ways to Keep Your Cool in Stressful Times, Published by Tandem Library, 2000. .
 Don't Sweat the Small Stuff in Love: Simple Ways to Nurture and Strengthen Your Relationships While Avoiding the Habits That Break Down Your Loving Connection, with Kristine Carlson. Published by Hyperion Books, 2000. .
 The Don't Sweat Guide for Parents: Reduce Stress and Enjoy Your Kids More, Don't Sweat Press, Publisher, Don't Sweat Press, Published by Hyperion, 2001. .
 Don't Sweat the Small Stuff for Men: Simple Ways to Minimize Stress in a Competitive World,  Published by Hyperion, 2001. .
 Don't Sweat the Small Stuff for Women: Simple and Practical Ways to Do What Matters Most and Find Time for You, with Kristine Carlson, Published by Hyperion, 2001, .
 The Don't Sweat Guide for Moms: Being More Relaxed and Peaceful So Your Kids Are, Too, with Don't Sweat Press, Kristine Carlson. Published by Hyperion, 2002. .
 The Don't Sweat Guide for Graduates: Facing New Challenges with Confidence, Don't Sweat Press. Published by Hyperion, 2002. .
 What About the Big Stuff?: Finding Strength and Moving Forward When the Stakes Are High. Published by Hyperion Books, 2003. .
 The Don't Sweat Guide for Teachers: Cutting Through the Clutter So That Every Day Counts, Don't Sweat Press, Published by Hyperion, 2003. .
 The Don't Sweat Guide for Dads: Stopping Stress from Getting in the Way of What Really Matters, Published by Hyperion, 2003. .
 The Don't Sweat Guide to Your Job Search: Finding a Career You Really Love, by Editors of Don't Sweat Press, Richard Carlson, Published by Hyperion, 2004. .
 Easier Than You Think: The Small Changes That Add Up to a World of Difference. Harper, 1995. 
 Don't Get Scrooged: How to Thrive in a World Full of Obnoxious, Incompetent, Arrogant, and Downright Mean-spirited People, Published by HarperCollins, 2006. .
 You Can Be Happy No Matter What: Five Principles for Keeping Life in Perspective, Contributor Dr. Wayne Dyer. Published by New World Library, 2006. .
 An Hour to Live, an Hour to Love: The True Story of the Best Gift Ever Given, with Kristine Carlson. Hyperion 2007. .
 Focus on the Good Stuff: The Power of Appreciation, by Mike Robbins, Richard Carlson. Published by Wiley Default, 2007. .
 Stop Thinking, Start Living.

References

External links

 Don't Sweat.com official site
 Co-author Joe Bailey Site
 Graphical compilation of Richard Carlson's Weekly Thoughts

Obituaries
 The San Francisco Chronicle (16 December 2006)

American motivational speakers
American motivational writers
American psychotherapists
American self-help writers
People from Piedmont, California
Pepperdine University alumni
Writers from California
1961 births
2006 deaths
Deaths from pulmonary embolism